The dark-footed mouse shrew (Myosorex cafer) is a species of mammal in the family Soricidae found in Mozambique, South Africa, Eswatini, and Zimbabwe. Its natural habitat is subtropical or tropical moist montane forests. It was formerly sometimes called the dark-footed forest shrew.

References

Myosorex
Taxonomy articles created by Polbot
Mammals described in 1846